There are different claims of wars extended by diplomatic irregularity which involve long peaceful periods after the end of hostilities where, for various reasons, the belligerents could be considered to be in a technical state of war.  For example, occasionally small countries named in a declaration of war would accidentally be omitted from a peace treaty ending the wider conflict.

Such "extended wars" are discovered much after the fact, and have no impact during the long period (often hundreds of years) after the actual fighting ended. The discovery of an "extended war" is sometimes an opportunity for a friendly ceremonial peace to be contracted by the belligerent parties. Such peace ceremonies are even conducted after ancient wars where no peace treaty was expected in the first place, and in cases where the countries were not even at war at all, such as the case of Berwick-upon-Tweed and Russia. These "treaties" often involve non-sovereign sub-national entities, such as cities, who do not in reality have the power to declare or end wars.

Related situations (not necessarily listed below) include:
 Frozen conflicts, where an armistice (ceasefire) is signed or fighting comes to an end, but there is intentionally no peace treaty because the underlying political conflict has not been resolved.
 A state of war that ends without a peace treaty when the original declaration of war was deemed to be illegal, such as the declaration of war by Thailand against the United States was mutually recognized to be after World War II.
 Political conflicts that continue after the signing of a peace treaty that formally ends the state of war.  For example, the Soviet–Japanese Joint Declaration of 1956 ended the state of war between Japan and the Soviet Union that was declared during World War II, but the Kuril Islands dispute remains an unresolved consequence of the war.



Extended wars

Symbolic peace agreements

See also
 List of conflicts by duration
 List of ongoing armed conflicts
 Nizari–Seljuk conflicts

References

Extended wars
History of international relations